The Manipur Kingdom
was an ancient independent kingdom at the India–Burma frontier   that was in subsidiary alliance with British India from 1824, and became a princely state in 1891. It bordered Assam Province in the west and British Burma in the east, and in the 20th century covered an area of 22,327 square kilometres (8,621 sq mi) and contained 467 villages. The capital of the state was Imphal.

The early history of Manipur is composed of mythical narratives. The Kangla Fort, located on the banks of the Imphal River, is where the palace of King Pakhangba was located. It was built in 1632 by king Khagemba, who had defeated Chinese invaders. In the fort, a number of temples that had traditional religious significance are located. Kangla means "dry land" in the old Meitei language.

Kangleipak State 
Loyumba Shinyen, the written constitution of Kangleipak was formally developed by King Loiyumba (1074-1121) in 1110 AD. He consolidated the kingdom by incorporating most of the principalities in the surrounding hills.
After subjugating all the villages within their valley Kangleipak kings grew in power and began a policy of expansion beyond their territory. In 1443 King Ningthoukhomba raided Akla (present day Tamu, Myanmar), an area ruled by Shan people, initiating a policy of Manipuri claims to the neighbouring Kabaw Valley.
The zenith of the Kangleipak State was reached under the rule of King Khagemba (1597–1652). Khagemba's brother Prince Shalungba was not happy about Khagemba's rule so he fled to the Taraf where he allied with the local Bengali Muslim leaders. With a contingent of Bengali Muslim soldiers led by Muhammad Sani, Shalungba then attempted to invade Manipur but the soldiers were captured and made to work as labourers in Manipur. These soldiers married local Meitei women and adapted to the Meitei language. They introduced hookah to Manipur and founded the Meitei Pangals (Manipuri Muslim community).  It is claimed that Manipur learned the art of making gunpowder from the Chinese merchants who visited the state around 1630 and had started making rockets named Meikappi by the early 18th century.

Manipur State 
In 1714, King Pamheiba was initiated into Gaudiya Vaishnavism by Shantidas Gosai,  a Bengali Hindu from Sylhet. He made the Gaudiya Vaishnava faith the state religion, replacing Meitei religion, made the Meitei language (aka Manipuri language) written in Bengali script, destroying many documents of Meitei language written in Meitei script and changed his name to Garib Niwaj. In 1724, the Sanskrit name Manipur was adopted as the name of the state, to make the realm eponymous with Manipura of the Mahabharata. King Garib Niwaj made several incursions into Burma, but no permanent conquest. After the death of Gharib Nawaz in 1754, Manipur was occupied by the Kingdom of Burma and the Meitei king Bhagyachandra sought help from the British, but when the British didn't help he went to Ahom King Rajeswar Singha who sent a force of 40,000 under Haranath Senapati Phukan to free Manipur. A treaty of alliance was negotiated in 1762 and a military force sent to assist Manipur. The force was later recalled and then the state was left to its own devices. Manipur was invaded at the onset of the First Anglo-Burmese War, together with Cachar and Assam.

British protectorate
Following the Burmese invasions, in 1824 the king of Manipur Gambhir Singh (Chinglen Nongdrenkhomba) asked the British for help and the request was granted. Sepoys and artillery were sent and British officers trained a levy of Manipuri troops for the battles that ensued. After the Burmese were expelled, the Kabaw Valley down to the Ningthi River was added to the state.
In 1824–1826, on the conclusion of the First Anglo-Burmese War,  Manipur became a British protectorate.

Manipur remained relatively peaceful and prosperous until King Gambhir Singh's death in 1834. When he died his son was only one year old and his uncle Nara Singh was appointed as regent. That same year the British decided to restore the Kabaw Valley to the Kingdom of Burma, which had never been happy about the loss. A compensation was paid to Raja of Manipur in the form of an annual allowance of Rs 6,370 and a British residency was established in Imphal, the only town of the state, in 1835 to facilitate communication between the British and the rulers of Manipur.

After a thwarted attempt on his life, Nara Singh took power and held the throne until his death in 1850. 
His brother Devendra Singh was given the title of Raja by the British, but he was unpopular. After only three months Chandrakirti Singh invaded Manipur and rose to the throne, while Devendra Singh fled to Cachar. Numerous members of the royal family tried to overthrow Chandrakirti Singh, but none of the rebellions was successful. In 1879, when British Deputy Commissioner G.H. Damant was killed by an Angami Naga party, the king of Manipur assisted the British by sending troops to neighbouring Kohima. Following this service to the crown, Chandrakirti Singh was rewarded with the Order of the Star of India.

After Maharaja Chandrakriti's death in 1886 his son Surachandra Singh succeeded him. As in previous occasions, several claimants to the throne tried to overthrow the new king. The first three attempts were defeated, but in 1890, following an attack on the palace by Tikendrajit and Kulachandra Singh, two of the king's brothers, Surachandra Singh announced his intention to abdicate and left Manipur for Cachar. Kulachandra Singh, the king's younger brother, then rose to the throne while Tikendrajit Singh, an older brother and commander of the Manipuri armed forces, held the real power behind the scenes. Meanwhile, Surachandra Singh, once safely away from Manipur appealed to the British for help to recover the throne.

The 'Manipur Expedition'

The British decided to recognise Juvraj Kulachandra Singh as Raja, and to send a military expedition of 400 men to Manipur to punish Senapati Tikendrajit Singh as the main person responsible for the unrest and the dynastic disturbances. This action and the violent events that followed are known in British annals as the 'Manipur Expedition, 1891', while in Manipur they are known as the 'Anglo-Manipur War of 1891'.

The British attempt to remove Tikendrajit from his position as military commander (Senapati) and arrest him on 24 March 1891 caused a great stir. The British Residency in Imphal was attacked and the Chief Commissioner for Assam J.W. Quinton, Col. Sken, the British Resident and other British officials were murdered. In the middle of the unrest Ethel St Clair Grimwood, the widow of Frank St Clair Grimmond, the killed British Resident, was credited with leading a retreat of surviving sepoys out of Manipur to Cachar. She was later lauded as a hero.) A 5,000 strong punitive expedition was sent against Manipur on 27 April 1891. Three British columns entered Manipur from British Burma, Cachar and the Naga Hills, which after several skirmishes with the 3,000 men strong Manipuri army, managed to pacify the kingdom. Following the British attack Senapati Tikendrajit and young king Kulachandra fled, but were captured. The Senapati and those Manipuris who had been involved in the killing of the British officers were tried and hanged, while the deposed King Kulachandra and other leaders of the rebellion were sent to the Cellular Jail in the Andaman Islands. At this time until 22 September 1891, Manipur was briefly annexed to British India by virtue of the doctrine of lapse. On 22 September 1891 when Meidingngu Churachand (Churachandra), a 5-year-old boy, was put on the throne, power was restored nominally to the Manipuri crown over the state. During the dynastic disturbances and the British intervention the Naga and Kuki hill tribes of the state lapsed into lawlessness, with numerous instances of murder and arson in the mountain villages, a situation that lasted well into 1894.

The 20th century: Twilight and end of the princely state

The child ruler Churachand belonged to a side branch of the Manipur royal family, so that all the main contenders to the throne were bypassed. While he was a minor the affairs of state were administered by the British Political Agent, which facilitated the introduction and implementation of reforms. The first paved road to Manipur was inaugurated in 1900 —until then there had been no proper roads to reach the kingdom— and this improvement in communication facilitated a visit by Viceroy Lord Curzon in 1901.
Raja Churachand was formally declared king in 1907 after completing education in Ajmer.
In 1918 he was given the privilege to use the title 'Maharaja' and during his reign Manipur enjoyed a period of relative peace and prosperity. In 1934 king Churachand was knighted by the British, becoming Sir Churachandra Singh.

Between March 1944 and July 1944 part of Manipur and the Naga Hills District of Assam Province were occupied by the Imperial Japanese Army. The capital Imphal was shelled on 10 May 1942.

The last ruler of the Kingdom of Manipur was Maharaja Bodhchandra Singh. He ruled between 1941 and 1949.

Incorporation into India
On 14 August 1947, with the lapse of paramountcy of the British Crown, Manipur became briefly "independent", i.e., free of control from the Governor of Assam, which may be regarded as reversion to political autonomy that existed before 1891  However, the Maharaja had already agreed to accede to India on 11 August, the three subjects of defence, external affairs and communication were ceded to India on assurance of autonomy and independence of Manipur be granted in dealing with the new India (Dominion of India). A 'Manipur State Constitution Act 1947' was enacted, giving the state its own constitution, although this did not become known in other parts of India owing to the relative isolation of the kingdom. The Government of India did not recognize the Constitution.

On 21 September 1949, the Maharaja was coerced to sign a Merger Agreement with the Union of India, to take effect on 15 October the same year. As a result of the agreement, the Manipur State merged into the Indian Union as a Part C State (similar to a Chief Commissioner's Province under the colonial regime or a Union Territory in the present Indian structure), to be governed by a Chief Commissioner appointed by the Government of India. The representative assembly of Manipur was abolished.

Unhappy with the central rule, Rishang Keishing began a movement for representative government in Manipur in 1954. The Indian home minister, however, declared that the time was not yet ripe for the creation of representative assemblies in Part C States such as Manipur and Tripura, claiming they were located in strategic border areas of India, that the people were politically backward and that the administration in those states was still weak. However, it was given a substantial measure of local self-government under the Territorial Councils Act of 1956, a legislative body and council of ministers in 1963, and full statehood in 1972.

Rulers

The rulers of Manipur state were entitled to an 11-gun salute by the British authorities. The present dynasty began in 1714.

1709–1754 Gharib Nawaz (Pamheiba) (d. 1754)
1754–1756 Bharat Shah (Chitsai)
1756–1764 Guru Sham (Gaurisiam) (d. 1764)
1764–1798 Jai Singh (Bhagya Chandra)
1798–1801 Rohinchandra (Harshachandra Singh) (d. 1801)
1801–1806 Maduchandra Singh (d. 1806) 
1806–1812 Charajit Singh (d. 1812) 
1812–1819 Marjit Singh (d. 1824)

Rajas under Burmese rule 
There were two feudatory kings during the time of the Burmese invasions.
1819–1823 Shubol 
1823–1825 Pitambara Singh

Rajas under British protection 
26 Jun 1825 – 9 January 1834 Gambhir Singh (d. 1834) 
1834–1844 Nara Singh – Regent (d. 1850)
1844 – 10 April 1850 Nara Singh (s.a.)
1850 (3 months) Devendra Singh (d. 1871) 
1850 – May 1886 Chandrakirti Singh (s.a.) (b. 1831 – d. 1886) (from 18 February 1880, Sir Chandrakirti Singh)
1886 – 24 September 1890 Surachandra Singh (d. 1891) 
24 Sep 1890 – 19 April 1891 Kulachandra Singh (b. 18.. – d. 1934)
19 Apr 1891 – 18 September 1891 Interregnum
18 Sep 1891 – 1918 Churachandra Singh (b. 1885 – d. 1941)

Maharajas 
1918 – Sep 1941 Sir Churachandra Singh (s.a.) (from 1 January 1934, Sir Churachandra Singh)
Sep 1941 – 15 October 1949 Bodhchandra Singh (b. 1909 – d. 1955)

British administrators

Political agents
The Political agents were subordinated to the Chief Commissioner of Assam (Lieutenant Governor of East Bengal and Assam during 1905–1912)

1835–1844 George Gordon 
1844–1863 William McCulloch (1st time)
1863–1865 Dillon  
1865–1867 William McCulloch (2nd time) (s.a.) 
1867–1875 Robert Brown 
1875–1877 Guybon Henry Damant (acting)
1877–1886 Sir James Johnstone
1886 (6 weeks) Trotter (acting) 
25 Mar 1886 – 21 April 1886 Walter Haiks (acting) 
1886 – 24 April 1891 St. Clair Grimwood (d. 1891) 
1891 Sir Henry Collett (British commander)
1891–1893 H.St.P. John Maxwell (1st time)
1893–1895 Alexander Porteous (1st time) 
1895–1896 H.St.P. John Maxwell (2nd time)
1896–1898 Henry Walter George Cole (1st time) (acting)
1898–1899 Alexander Porteous (2nd time) 
1899–1902 H.St.P. John Maxwell (3rd time) 
1902–1904 Albert Edward Woods 
1904–1905 H.St.P. John Maxwell (4th time) 
1905–1908 John Shakespear (1st time) 
1908–1909 A.W. Davis 
1909–1914 John Shakespear (2nd time) 
1914–1917 Henry Walter George Cole (2nd time) (s.a.) 
1917–1918 John Comyn Higgins (1st time)
1918–1920 William Alexander Cosgrave
1920–1922 L.O. Clarke (1st time) 
1922 Christopher Gimson (1st time) (acting) 
1922–1924 L.O. Clarke (2nd time) 
1924–1928 John Comyn Higgins (2nd time) (s.a.) 
12 Mar 1928 – 23 November 1928 C.G. Crawford 
1928–1933 John Comyn Higgins (3rd time) (s.a.) 
1933–1938 Christopher Gimson (2nd time) (s.a.) 
1938–1941 Gerald Pakenham Stewart (1st time) (Japanese prisoner 1941–45)
1941–1946 Christopher Gimson (3rd time) (s.a.)
Dec 1946 – 14 August 1947 Gerald Pakenham Stewart (2nd time)

Indian administration 
Political agents
The Indian Agents were subordinated to the Governor of Assam.
 15 August 1947 – 1947 Gerald Pakenham Stewart (s.a.)
 1947–1948 Shri Debeswar Sharma

Dewans
The Dewans were representing the Governor of Assam.
1948 – 16 April 1949 Maharaj Kumar Priyobrata Singh (s.a.)
16 Apr 1949 – 15 October 1949 Rawal Amar Singh

Flags
The State of Manipur had a set of two flags, a white one and a red one. All featured the Pakhangba dragon in the centre, although not as prominently in the latter flags.

See also
History of Manipur
Manipur State Constitution Act 1947
Meitei inscriptions
Ningthouja dynasty
Meitei mythology
Political integration of India

References

Bibliography

 
 
 L. Joychandra Singh, The Lost Kingdom: Royal Chronicle of Manipur, Prajatantra Publishing House, 1995.

External links

 Territorial Councils Act, 1956, Lok Sabha Bills, retrieved 25 November 2020.
Puya – Meithaba: The Date Controversy
Seven clans of Manipur

 
 Hosting sites of FOTW, National Flag

Princely states of India
History of Manipur
Bengal Presidency
Kingdoms of Northeast India
Former kingdoms
History of Myanmar
Former monarchies of Asia
12th-century establishments in India
1110 establishments in Asia
1949 disestablishments in India